Zhang Nan, Zhāng Nán, or Nan Zhang may refer to:

 Zhang Nan (Three Kingdoms) or Wenjin (died 222), Shu Han general
 Nan Zhang (actress) (born 1986), Chinese-American actress
 Zhang Nan (gymnast) (born 1986), Chinese gymnast
 Zhang Nan (cyclist) (born 1989), Chinese cyclist
 Zhang Nan (badminton) (born 1990), Chinese badminton player
 Zhāng Nán, better known as Kelly Zhang, CEO of ByteDance China